The Flag of Dubrovnik is the symbol of the city of Dubrovnik, originating as the flag of the historical Republic of Ragusa.

The flag depicts Saint Blaise, the patron saint of Dubrovnik.

See also
Coat of arms of Dubrovnik
Dubrovnik
Republic of Ragusa

Dubrovnik
Dubrovnik
Dubrovnik